The 2009 Sundance Film Festival was held during January 15, 2009 until January 25 in Park City, Utah. It was the 25th iteration of the Sundance Film Festival.

Award winners
Grand Jury Prize: Documentary - We Live in Public
Grand Jury Prize: Dramatic - Precious: Based on the Novel "Push" by Sapphire
Grand Jury Prize: World Cinema Dramatic - The Maid (La Nana)
Grand Jury Prize: World Cinema Documentary - Rough Aunties
Audience Award: Documentary - The Cove
Audience Award: Dramatic - Precious: Based on the Novel "Push" by Sapphire
World Cinema Audience Award: Documentary - Afghan Star
World Cinema Audience Award: Dramatic - An Education
Documentary Directing Award - Natalia Almada for El General
Dramatic Directing Award - Cary Joji Fukunaga for Sin Nombre
World Cinema Directing Award: Dramatic - Oliver Hirschbiegel for Five Minutes of Heaven
World Cinema Directing Award: Documentary - Havana Marking for Afghan Star
Excellence in Cinematography Award: Documentary - Bob Richman for The September Issue
Excellence in Cinematography Award: Dramatic - Adriano Goldman for Sin Nombre
World Cinema Cinematography Award: Dramatic - John De Borman for An Education
World Cinema Cinematography Award: Documentary - John Maringouin for Big River Man
Documentary Film Editing - Karen Schmeer for Sergio
World Cinema Documentary Editing Award - Janus Billeskov Jansen and Thomas Papapetros for Burma VJ
Waldo Salt Screenwriting Award: Dramatic - Nicholas Jasenovec and Charlyne Yi  for Paper Heart
World Cinema Screenwriting Award - Guy Hibbert for Five Minutes of Heaven
Special Jury Prize for Originality, World Cinema Drama - Louise-Michel
Special Jury Prize, World Cinema Documentary - Tibet in Song
Special Jury Prize for Acting, World Cinema - Catalina Saavedra for The Maid (La Nana)
Special Jury Prize, U.S. Documentary - Good Hair
Special Jury Prize for Spirit of Independence - Humpday
Special Jury Prize for Acting - Mo'Nique for Precious: Based on the Novel "Push" by Sapphire
Jury Prize, U.S. Short Filmmaking - Short Term 12
Jury Prize, International Short Filmmaking - Lies
2009 Alfred P. Sloan Prize - Adam

Jurors
Dramatic Jury
Virginia Madsen – (Actress: Sideways, Number 23, The Rainmaker, David Lynch's Dune)
Scott McGehee – (Producer/Director/Writer: Uncertainty, The Deep End, Suture)
Maud Nadler – (Producer/HBO Films: Relative Values)
Mike White – (Writer/Director/Producer: Year Of The Dog)
Boaz Yakin – (Director/Writer/Producer: Fresh, Remember The Titans, Hostel)

Documentary Jury
Patrick Creadon – (Writer/Director/Director of Photography: Wordplay, Writer/Director/Director of Photography: I.O.U.S.A.)
Carl Deal – (Director/Producer: Trouble The Water)
Andrea Meditch – (Executive Producer/Producer: Man on Wire, In The Shadow Of The Moon)
Sam Pollard – (Editor: When The Levees Broke, Jungle Fever, Mo' Better Blues)
Marina Zenovich – (Director/Producer/Writer: Roman Polanski: Wanted and Desired)

World Dramatic Jury
Colin Brown (New York) – (Editor: Screen International)
Christine Jeffs (New Zealand) – (Director/Writer: Rain, Stroke; Director: Sunshine Cleaning)
Vibeke Windelov (Denmark) – (Producer: Dogville, Breaking The Waves, Dancer In The Dark)

World Documentary Jury
Gillian Armstrong (Australia) – (Director: Death Defying Acts, Oscar & Lucinda, Little Women)
Thom Powers (New York) – (Documentary Programmer, Toronto International Film Festival)
Hubert Sauper (France) – (Director/Producer: Darwin's Nightmare)

Shorts Jury
Gerardo Naranjo – (Director/Writer/Producer: "I’m Gonna Explode", Malachance, Perro Negro)
Lou Taylor Pucci – (Actor: Thumbsucker)
Sharon Swart – (Reporter: Variety)

Alfred P. Sloan Jury (Award presented to the writer and director of an outstanding feature film focusing on science or technology as a theme, or depicting a scientist, engineer, or mathematician as a major character)
Fran Bagenal – (Professor of Astrophysical & Planetary Sciences, University of Colorado)
Rodney Brooks – (Panasonic Professor of Robotics, MIT Computer Science & AI Lab)
Ray Gesteland – (Department of Human Genetics, University of Utah)
Jeffrey Nachmanoff – (Writer: The Day After Tomorrow; Writer/Director: Traitor)
Alex Rivera – (Director/Writer/Editor: Sleep Dealer)

See also
List of films at the 2009 Sundance Film Festival

References

External links
Festival webpage
2009 Sundance Film Festival Festival Tips
Yahoo Movies

2009
2009 in Utah
2009 film festivals
2009 in American cinema
2009 festivals in the United States
January 2009 events in the United States